Lunacy is the game for the 2009 FIRST Robotics Competition.
Announced on January 3, 2009, the name and some of the features of the game honor the 40th anniversary of the first human mission to the Moon (Latin: Luna). It is FRC's 18th game. This is the first FRC competition to use the cRIO Mobile Device Controller control system from National Instruments. The driver station introduced for 2009 was the Kwikbyte DS, which was replaced in 2010 by the Classmate PC.

Game overview

Scoring
Moon Rocks  (Orange and Purple) — 120 available — 2 pts each
Empty Cells (Orange and Blue)   —  Up to 8 — 2 pts each
Super Cells (Green and Purple)  —  Up to 8 — 15 pts each

Total score for the alliance is the total number of points scored by placing Moon Rocks, Empty Cells and Super Cells in the trailers of all of the robots of the opposing alliance, less any deductions for penalties.

Field

Lunacy is played on a rectangular field that is 54' by 27'. This field is a material called 'Glasliner FRP' and is referred to as 'Regolith'. The regolith is designed so that the robots, which have special mandated wheels that they cannot modify in any way, shape or form, have reduced traction, mimicking the effect of low gravity that would be seen by a robot driving on the moon.

Alliances
There are 6 robots on the field at a time, 3 on the red alliance and 3 on the blue alliance. Each team consists of 4 players - 2 drivers, a coach and a human player. There are a total of 6 human players, 3 on each alliance since there are 3 teams per alliance. Each alliance is assigned the 2 corner positions at either end of one long side of the field, and one position in the middle of the opposite long side of the field. All human players start with 20 Moon Rocks, and the players in the middle have, in addition to the 20 Moon Rocks, 4 Empty Cells. Each team can place up to 7 of their 20 Moon Rocks into their robot before the competition begins, but each human player must retain at least 13 Moon Rocks to start.

Robots
Robots have to fit within a 38" by 28" footprint, be less than or equal to 60" tall, and weigh under or equal to 120 pounds.  The robots drag trailers behind them that correspond to the color of the alliance they are on. It is not possible for a robot to have any mechanism that takes Moon Rocks out of their trailer, or prevent another robot or human player from placing balls into their trailer. Robots must have bumpers on them in order to protect from damage from the collisions that will inevitably occur.

Game Play
The goal of the game is to score as many of the game pieces in the opposing side's trailers as possible. Robots start out in front of the opposite alliances' human players. There is a 15-second autonomous period, during which robots operate according to programs that teams download to their robot, and a 2-minute Teleoperated period, where robots are driven and controlled by a human drive subteam at one end of the field. Empty cells (also worth 2 points) must be handed to a robot by the "payload specialist" at the mid-field position known as the "outpost". The robot must deliver the Empty Cell to their human player on one of the corners in order to get a Super Cell that is worth 15 points. A robot can only carry one Empty Cell at a time. Super Cells can only be put into play during the last 20 seconds of play, and only if the human player has been delivered an Empty Cell.

Common Robot Types

Shooter
"Shooter" robots were able to shoot one ball at a time, usually over a long range. Successful shooters were fairly uncommon, and often did not directly score. Instead, they shot balls to the Human Players at the corners. Self-reloading was very common amongst the shooters.

Dump bot
"Dumper" bots typically started out the match with their entire supply of balls for the match, which scored by driving alongside the opponent's trailer and dumping all their balls into the trailer.

Vomit bot

"Vomit" bots, also called "power dumpers", were a hybrid between the shooter and the dumper. They were often the best robots, combining the accuracy of the shooter with the massive scoring of the dumper. These robots would drive up to an opponents trailer and "vomit" a stream of balls into the trailer, (often as many as 10 or more at once). Many were self reloading, and were the rarest type of robot.

Dozer bot
"Dozer" bots were the most common, and often the least effective robots. These robots were bulldozer-like in function, pushing the balls to the corners. Some were just boxes that towed a trailer.

Competition schedule
Kickoff — January 3, 2009 
Shipping deadline — February 17, 2009 
Regional competitions — weekends, February 28, 2009 – April 6, 2009 
Championship — April 16, 2009 – April 18, 2009

Events

Regionals
The following regional events were held in 2009:

Arizona Regional - Phoenix
BAE Systems Granite State Regional - Manchester, NH
Bayou Regional - New Orleans
Boilermaker Regional - West Lafayette, IN
Boston Regional - Boston
Buckeye Regional - Cleveland, OH
Chesapeake Regional - Annapolis, MD
Colorado Regional - Denver
Connecticut Regional - Hartford, CT
Dallas Regional - Dallas
Finger Lakes Regional - Rochester, NY
Florida Regional - Orlando
Greater Kansas City Regional - Kansas City, MO
Greater Toronto Regional - Mississauga, ON
Hawaii Regional - Honolulu
Israel Regional - Tel Aviv, Israel
Las Vegas Regional - Las Vegas
Lone Star Regional - Houston
Los Angeles Regional - Long Beach, CA
Microsoft Seattle Regional - Seattle
Midwest Regional - Chicago
Minnesota 10000 Lakes Regional - Minneapolis
Minnesota North Star Regional - Minneapolis
NASA VCU Regional - Richmond, VA
New Jersey Regional - Trenton, NJ
New York City Regional - New York City
Oklahoma City Regional - Oklahoma City
Oregon Regional - Portland
Palmetto Regional - Clemson, SC
Peachtree Regional - Duluth, GA
Philadelphia Regional - Philadelphia
Pittsburgh Regional - Pittsburgh
St. Louis Regional - St. Louis
Sacramento Regional - Davis, CA
San Diego Regional - San Diego
SBPLI Long Island Regional - Hempstead, NY
Silicon Valley Regional - San Jose, CA
Washington DC Regional - Washington, DC
Waterloo Regional - Waterloo, ON
Wisconsin Regional - Milwaukee

Districts
2009 was the first year that district competitions were held; as part of FIRST in Michigan. The district events led up to the Michigan State Championship in Ypsilanti.
Traverse City FIRST Robotics District Competition - Traverse City
Kettering University FIRST Robotics District Competition - Flint
Cass Tech FIRST Robotics District Competition - Detroit
Detroit FIRST Robotics District Competition - Detroit
Lansing FIRST Robotics District Competition - Lansing
West Michigan FIRST Robotics District Competition - Allendale
Troy FIRST Robotics District Competition - Troy

World Championship
The 2009 FRC World Championships were held at the Georgia Dome in Atlanta, Georgia.

Final Rounds

Source:

Notes

External links

 
 
 

2009 in robotics
FIRST Robotics Competition games